Baioshona Union is an Union Parishad under Lohagara Upazila of Narail District in the division of Khulna, Bangladesh. It has an area of 69.93 km2 (27.00 sq mi and a population of 20,414.

References

Unions of Kalia Upazila
Unions of Narail District
Unions of Khulna Division